The Ilias Latina is a short Latin hexameter version of the Iliad of Homer that gained popularity in Antiquity and remained popular through the Middle Ages. It was very widely studied and read in Medieval schools as part of the standard Latin educational curriculum. According to Ernest Robert Curtius, it is a "crude condensation", into 1070 lines. It is attributed to Publius Baebius Italicus, said to be a Roman Senator, and to the decade 60 CE – 70 CE. It includes at least two acrostic elements: the first lines spell out ITALICUS, while the last lines spell SCRIPSIT, taken together translating "Italicus wrote (it)."

See also
Classical studies

References

Further reading
 Marco Scaffai, Baebii Italici Ilias Latina, Bologna, 1982.
 George A. Kennedy, The Latin Iliad. Introduction, Text, Translation, and Notes, 1998.
 Steven R. Perkins, Achilles In Rome: The Latin Iliad of Baebius Italicus, Introduction, Latin text, English translation, 2006.
 Maria Jennifer Falcone, Christoph Schubert, (eds.) Ilas Latina: Text, Interpretation, and Reception, Leiden, Brill, 2022.

External links
Online Latin text with adjustable interlinear vocabulary
Original Latin text online
Translation of this work to Portuguese

1st-century poems
Iliad
Latin poems
Translations into Latin